Kuol D. Kuol is a former South Sudan People's Defence Forces (SPLA) general and the chief administrator of the Abyei Area since June 29, 2020.

Kuol is a Ngok Dinka from Abyei. In 2012, Kuol was a lieutenant general in the SPLA, the army of South Sudan. On March 14, 2012, Kuol was put in charge of Operation Restore Peace, a disarmament program in Jonglei State. The disarmament program aimed to end intercommunal violence, however, it was resisted by the Nuer White Army, who clashed several times with the army. During the Heglig Crisis, Kuol was in favor of fighting the Sudanese Armed Forces if talks could not resolve the border dispute. Kuol was removed from active service in the SPLA and placed in reserve in January 2013. On December 18, 2018, President Salva Kiir Mayardit appointed Kuol as the principal of the SPLM political school, although it was unclear what the role of principal would entail. On June 29, 2020, Kiir appointed Kuol as the chief administrator of the Abyei Area, a region disputed with Sudan, succeeding Kuol Alor Kuol.

References 

Sudan People's Liberation Movement politicians
Living people
Year of birth missing (living people)
Dinka people
South Sudanese military personnel